Mechthild of the Palatinate (1418–1482) was a princess and major patroness of the literary arts in the 15th century.

Born to Ludwig III, Elector Palatine, she was married by the age of 15 to Ludwig I, Count of Württemberg-Urach. Five children came out of the marriage, but by age 31 she became a widow. She was remarried two years later to the Archduke Albert VI of Austria. After he died in 1463, she retired to her court at Rottenburg am Neckar. This court became a center of flourishing literary culture up until her death.

Some of the literary artists who she supported showed their appreciation for her through the dedication of literary works. After their initial meeting in 1460, Niklas van Wyle dedicated four of his translations to her.

Amongst many things, she was also known as a bibliophile. Jakob Püterich von Reichertshausen wrote a poem for her called Letter of Honor. In the poem, he lists and compares all the books that he and she had collected in their individual libraries. She had sent him a list of 94 of her books in advance of this poems creation for his use. Many of those in her possession, he had not even heard of before.
	
In collaboration with her son, Count Eberhard the Bearded of Württemberg, who was married to an Italian princess of the Gonzaga family, Barbara Gonzaga, she founded the University of Freiburg, in Freiburg im Breisgau, in 1457. She later co-founded the humanistic University of Tübingen in 1477.

She died on 22 August 1482 and was buried at the Charterhouse of Güterstein.

Issue
Ludwig I and Mechthild of the Palatinate had the following children:
Mechthild (aft 1436 – 6 June 1495), married since 1454 with Louis II, Landgrave of Hesse (1438–1471)
Ludwig II (3 April 1439 – 3 November 1457), since 1450 Count of Württemberg-Urach
Andreas (* 11.4 und † 19.5.1443)
Eberhard V (11 December 1445 – 24 February 1496), since 1457 count of Württemberg-Urach, since 1495 Duke Eberhard I. of Württemberg
Elisabeth (4 October 1447 – 3 June 1505), married since 1470 with Johann II of Nassau-Saarbrücken in Saarbrücken (1423–1472), and since 1474 with Heinrich dem Älteren, Count zu Stolberg (1436–1511)

References

External links

1418 births
1482 deaths
German princesses
German bibliophiles
University of Tübingen
University of Freiburg
House of Wittelsbach
Daughters of monarchs
Remarried royal consorts